Scrooge's Quest is a seven-part DuckTales comics story written by Marv Wolfman and published in 1990. The story was originally printed in the first seven issues of the comics series by Gladstone Publishing, and later reprinted in a graphic novel by Gemstone Publishing.

Summary 
Scrooge McDuck is led in a quest around the world by Magica De Spell, who has kidnapped his young ward Webigail and demands his Number One Dime as ransom.  Flintheart Glomgold takes advantage of Scrooge's distraction to destroy his business empire.

Part 1: The Ice Demon
Magica kidnaps Webby and Scrooge has to surrender his Number One Dime as ransom.  The first leg of his journey to get her back takes her to an ice bridge at the North Pole.

Part 2: The Nemesis of Napalabama
Scrooge's search for the kidnapped Webby takes him, Launchpad and the nephews to Napalabama where they investigate a crisis involving stolen bamboo.

Part 3: The Fall for New Atlantis
Scrooge is distracted by Webby's absence while conducting an inspection tour of McDuck Enterprises' undersea research lab, dubbed "New Atlantis."  Magica, agitated that Scrooge is drawing too close to her, recruits Flintheart Glomgold and the Beagle Boys as allies.

Part 4: Shipwrecked McDuck
After rescuing Webby, Scrooge decides to take her, Mrs. Beakley, Launchpad McQuack, and his nephews on a cruise, but he gets shipwrecked along the way.

Part 5: Down But Not Out in Duckburg
Scrooge, Launchpad and the nephews return to Duckburg, only to find out that Flintheart Glomgold has taken over.

Part 6: Witch Way Did She Go?
Scrooge, Launchpad, Webby, and the nephews have to retrieve Scrooge's Number One Dime from Magica De Spell.

Part 7: All That Glitters is Not Glomgold
Scrooge, Launchpad, Webby and the Nephews return to Duckburg to free it from Flintheart's control.

External links
Scrooge's Quest at Inducks COA

DuckTales
Disney comics stories